Marek Hovorka (born 8 October 1984) is a Slovak professional ice hockey forward currently playing for Vlci Žilina of the Slovak 1. Liga.

Career
Hovorka previously played HC Slovan Ústečtí Lvi, BK Mladá Boleslav, HC Kladno, HC Sparta Praha, HC Karlovy Vary, Piráti Chomutov and HC Vítkovice. He also played in the Kontinental Hockey League for Admiral Vladivostok and in the Slovak Extraliga for MHC Martin, MHK 32 Liptovský Mikuláš, MsHK Žilina and HC Košice.

Career statistics

Regular season and playoffs

International

References

External links

1984 births
Living people
Admiral Vladivostok players
BK Mladá Boleslav players
HC Karlovy Vary players
Rytíři Kladno players
HC Košice players
HC Slovan Ústečtí Lvi players
HC Sparta Praha players
HC Vítkovice players
Ice hockey players at the 2018 Winter Olympics
MHC Martin players
MHk 32 Liptovský Mikuláš players
MsHK Žilina players
Olympic ice hockey players of Slovakia
People from Dubnica nad Váhom
Sportspeople from the Trenčín Region
Piráti Chomutov players
Slovak ice hockey forwards
Slovak expatriate ice hockey players in the Czech Republic
Slovak expatriate ice hockey players in Russia
Slovak expatriate sportspeople in Poland
Expatriate ice hockey players in Poland